Raheim "Rocket" Sanders (born June 8, 2002) is an American football running back for the Arkansas Razorbacks.

Career
Sanders attended Rockledge High School in Rockledge, Florida. Sanders was a three-sport athlete playing football, basketball, and track. Sanders averaged 9.5 points per game and 5.7 rebounds per game his junior season on the hardwood. Ran an 11.31 in the 100-meter dash during his first high school track meet. He played running back, wide receiver and linebacker in high school. He committed to the University of Arkansas to play college football.

As a true freshman at Arkansas in 2021, Sanders played in all 13 games and had 578 yards on 114 carries with five touchdowns. He returned to Arkansas as the starting running back in 2022.

Statistics

References

External links
Arkansas Razorbacks bio

Living people
Players of American football from Florida
American football running backs
Arkansas Razorbacks football players
People from Rockledge, Florida
2003 births